Edward Epstein may refer to:
 Edward Jay Epstein (born 1935), American investigative journalist
 Edward Epstein (meteorologist) (1931–2008), American meteorologist